Research institutes in Seattle include universities, corporations, nonprofit organizations, and other research groups doing research in Seattle.

Health, medicine, and biomedical research
 Allen Institute for Brain Science
 Bill & Melinda Gates Foundation
 Center for Global Infectious Disease Research (formerly known as Seattle Biomedical Research Institute or SBRI)
 Fred Hutchinson Cancer Research Center
 Infectious Disease Research Institute
 Institute for Systems Biology
 Northeastern University - Seattle Campus
 Pacific Northwest Research Institute
 PATH
 Seattle Children's Research Institute
 SightLife
 University of Washington Department of Global Health
 Washington State University School for Global Animal Health
 Washington Biotechnology & Biomedical Association
 World Vision

Global health
 American Leprosy Missions
 Battelle Health & Life Sciences
 Big Water Consulting
 The Carter Center
 Cascade Designs, Inc.
 Days for Girls
 Friends of Chidamoyo
 The Geneva Foundation
 Global Health Technologies Coalition
 Global Impact
 Global Washington
 Islamic Relief US
 MAP International
 Med25 International
 Medical Teams International
 Northwest Association for Biomedical Researchers
 One By One
 Open Arms Perinatal Services
 Pacific Northwest Diabetes Research Institute
 Planned Parenthood of the Great Northwest
 Peace Health
 Project Concern International
 SCOPE
 Seattle Cancer Care Alliance
 Seattle Central Community College
 SPLASH
 Swedish Hospital & Medical Center
 University Presbyterian Church
 U.S. Fund for UNICEF
 VillageReach
 Washington MESA
 World Affairs Council of Seattle

Data, computing and artificial intelligence
 Allen Institute for Artificial Intelligence (AI2)
 Northeastern University - Seattle Campus
 Pacific Northwest National Laboratory - Seattle Research Center
 University of Washington Computer Science & Engineering Department 

 
Seattle
Non-profit organizations based in Seattle
Global health